Stephan Scott Grundy (June 28, 1967 – September 29, 2021), also known by the pen-name Kveldulf Gundarsson, was an American author, scholar, goði and proponent of Asatru. He published more than two dozen books and several papers. He is best known for his modern adaptations of legendary sagas and was also a non-fiction writer on Germanic mythology, Germanic paganism, and Germanic neopaganism.

Life and career
Grundy was born in New York and grew up in Dallas, where he studied English and German philology at Southern Methodist University. In 1995, he received his PhD from the Department of Anglo-Saxon, Norse and Celtic at the University of Cambridge with a dissertation on the Norse god Odin: "The Cult of Óðinn: God of Death?".

Before publishing his first novel, Grundy published, as Kveldulf Gundarsson, two books on Germanic neopaganism and Germanic magic. He served as Lore Warden and Master of the Elder Training Program for the Ring of Troth (now The Troth) and carried on the organization's tradition of being based in scholarship, started by Edred Thorsson. Mattias Gardell also regards him as important in the organization's move to the left and development of a "strict antiracist and antisexist ideology." He edited and co-wrote both editions of The Troth's handbook, Our Troth, and has written other works on ancient and modern Germanic paganism and Germanic culture.

He is cited by other writers on Germanic paganism inside and outside academia, for example as Grundy by Jenny Blain in her discussion of the social role of seiðr in Iceland, also as Grundy by Julia Bolton Holloway on pagan priestesses, and by Charlotte Hardman and Graham Harvey in their survey of neo-paganism for editing Our Troth as well as having "clarified the group's objection to fascism and racism".

He died in Shinrone, County Offaly, Ireland, where he was studying medicine.

Novels

Rhinegold
Grundy began working on his first complete novel during his freshman year at Southern Methodist University. Originally, the novel was intended to be based on the Anglo-Saxon epic poem Beowulf, but Grundy was convinced by his professor Dr. Stephen Flowers (author of numerous widely respected works about Germanic history and magic) that the Nibelung legend would be a more appropriate basis for a first novel.

Grundy wrote most of the novel in a dormitory at the University of St Andrews, Scotland, where he spent one year as an exchange student. He also spent a year as an exchange student in Bonn, Germany – virtually at the foot of the Drachenfels - spending some of his time on research for his novel (which also led him all across Scandinavia). Rhinegold – a retelling of the entire Sigurð cycle dedicated to, among others, Richard Wagner and J. R. R. Tolkien –  came out in 1994, and quickly developed into an international best-seller.

Terri Windling identified Rhinegold as one of the best fantasy debuts of 1994, describing it as "both scholarly and entertaining".

Attila's Treasure
Two years later, 1996, Grundy completed Attila's Treasure, focused less on Attila the Hun than on Grundy's favorite legendary figure, Hagen. This novel, too, was an international success, but to a lesser degree than the forerunner novel Rhinegold.

Gilgamesh
This was followed in 1999 by Gilgamesh, a modern adaptation of the Sumerian Epic of Gilgamesh that attempts to address directly the homosexual nature of the original text largely ignored by modern scholars. This was less well received than the two earlier novels.

Falcon Dreams Series
With Melodi Lammond-Grundy, Grundy has since published the Falcon Dreams series, a trilogy first published in German and available in English in e-book format: Falcon's Flight (2000), Eagle and Falcon (2002), and Falcon's Night (2002).

Bibliography

Books
 Kveldulf Gundarsson: Teutonic Magic: The Magical & Spiritual Practices of the Germanic People, Llewellyn, 1990, 
 Kveldulf Gundarsson: Teutonic Religion: Folk Beliefs & Practices of the Northern Tradition, Llewellyn, 1993, 
 KveldúlfR Hagan Gundarsson, ed.: Our Troth, The Ring of Troth, 1993
 Stephan Grundy: Miscellaneous Studies Towards the Cult of Odinn, Everett, WA: Vikar, 1994; Troth Publications, 2014, .
 Stephan Grundy: Rhinegold, Michael Joseph, 1994, 
 Stephan Grundy: Attila's Treasure, Bantam, 1996, 
 Stephan Grundy: Gilgamesh, William Morrow, 1999, 
 Stephan Grundy and Melodi Lammond-Grundy: Falcon's Flight, 2000, e-book Double Dragon, 2006, 
 Stephan Grundy and Melodi Lammond-Grundy: Eagle and Falcon, 2002, e-book Double Dragon, 2006, 
 Stephan Grundy and Melodi Lammond-Grundy: Falcon's Night, 2002, e-book Double Dragon, 2006, 
 Kveldúlf Gundarsson, ed.: Our Troth, 2nd ed. volume 1 History and Lore Booksurge, 2006, ; volume 2 Living the Troth Booksurge, 2007, 
 Kveldulf Gundarsson: Elves, Wights, and Trolls, Studies Towards the Practice of Germanic Heathenry 1, iUniverse, 2007, 
 Stephan Grundy: The Cult of Ódinn: God of Death?, Troth Publications, 2014,  (hardcover). Reprint of 1995 PhD dissertation.
 Stephan Grundy: Beowulf, TLS, 2019,

Articles
 Stephan Grundy, "Chapter Four: Freyja and Frigg" in Sandra Billington and Miranda Green, eds., The Concept of the Goddess, Routledge, 1996, republished Taylor & Francis e-Library, 2000, pp. 56–67.
 Stephan Grundy, "Shapeshifting and Berserkergang" in Carol Poster and  Richard J. Utz, eds., Translation, Transformation and Transubstantiation in the Late Middle Ages, Disputatio 3 (1998), pp. 104–22.
 Kveldulf Gundarsson: numerous articles in Idunna and Mountain Thunder.

References

External links
 Stephan Grundy's website

1967 births
2021 deaths
20th-century American novelists
21st-century American novelists
American fantasy writers
American information and reference writers
American male novelists
American social sciences writers
American modern pagans
Adherents of Germanic neopaganism
Writers on Germanic paganism
Modern pagan writers
Modern pagan novelists
20th-century American non-fiction writers
21st-century American non-fiction writers
American male non-fiction writers
20th-century American male writers
21st-century American male writers
People from New York City